Gastón Gaudio was the defending champion, but did not participate this year.

Carlos Moyà won the title, defeating Filippo Volandri 7–6(8–6), 6–4 in the final.

Seeds

  David Nalbandian (withdrew)
  Guillermo Coria (second round)
  Juan Carlos Ferrero (semifinals)
  José Acasuso (quarterfinals)
  Carlos Moyà (champion)
  Filippo Volandri (final)
  Florent Serra (first round)
  Juan Ignacio Chela (second round)

Draw

Finals

Top half

Bottom half

External links
 2006 Copa Telmax Draw
 Main Draw
 Qualifying Draw

2006 ATP Tour
ATP Buenos Aires